The 2013 Angola 2nd Division Basketball Championship (1st edition), was a basketball tournament  held in Lubango, Angola, from November 16 to 23, 2013. The tournament, organized by the Angolan Basketball Federation, qualified the two top teams for the 2013–14 BAI Basket and was contested by 8 clubs split into 2 groups, that played in a round robin system followed by the knock-out stages (quarter, semis and final).
 
The tournament was won by Sporting Clube de Benguela.

Draw

Squads

Preliminary rounds

Group A

Group B

Knockout stage

Quarterfinals

5–8th place

Semifinals

7th place

5th place

Bronze medal game

Gold medal game

Final standings

All Tournament Team

See also
 2013–14 BAI Basket

References

External links 
 2013 FIBA Africa Champions Cup for Women Official Website
 

2013
Second